HK Olimpija Ljubljana may refer to:
HDD Olimpija Ljubljana, an ice hockey club established in 1928 and folded in 2017
HK Olimpija, an ice hockey club established in 2004

Sport in Ljubljana